Jacob Butula (1 January 1931 – 26 June 1992) was a Canadian boxer. He competed in the men's welterweight event at the 1952 Summer Olympics. He was killed in a car accident in 1992.

References

1931 births
1992 deaths
Canadian male boxers
Olympic boxers of Canada
Boxers at the 1952 Summer Olympics
Place of birth missing
Welterweight boxers
Road incident deaths in Canada